Zarqi (also Romanized as Zarqī) is a village in Soltanabad Rural District, in the Central District of Khoshab County, Razavi Khorasan Province, Iran. At the 2006 census, its population was 214, in 43 families.

References 

Populated places in Khoshab County